Salamá is a city in Guatemala. It is the capital of the department of Baja Verapaz and it is situated at 940 m above sea level. The municipality of Salamá, for which the city of Salamá serves as the administrative centre, covers a total surface area of 764 km² and contains 65,275 people.

Etymology
Salamá comes from Kʼicheʼ Tz'alam Ha meaning table on water.

History

Salamá was settled as a doctrine by the Order of Preachers in the 1550s, as part of the Tezulutlán Capitulations that friar Bartolome de las Casas lobbied from the Crown.  The friars had thousands of acres with hills, forest, a section of the plain and abundant water supply. Both location and weather were ideal for vines; the characteristic soil and dried grass from the rest of the plain was replaced by vines thanks to a superb irrigation system the friars built inspired by the Romans.

By 1829, the liberal forces of general Francisco Morazán expelled both the aristocrats and the regular orders from Central America, including the Order of Preachers, one of the richest. In Salamá, they had to leave behind their monastery, church and vines, which were confiscated by the Guatemalan State government, but remained abandoned due to the political turmoil of the times.

Battle of Salamá of 1839 

In early 1838, Morazán's liberal forces were back in Guatemala after a peasant revolt ousted Guatemalan governor Mariano Galvez. Morazán and his Guatemalan ally José Francisco Barrundia invaded Guatemalan soil and when they arrived in San Sur, they summarily executed Chúa Álvarez, general Rafael Carrera's father-in-law, because Carrera was the leader of the revolt. Morazán's soldiers placed Álvarez' head on top of a spike as a warning to Carrera's followers. Upon learning the news, both Carrera and his wife, Petrona Álvarez -who had left Guatemala City to face Morazán and were in Mataquescuintla- promised to avenge Chúa even after Morazán's death.  The liberals sent several envoys to try to meet with Carrera, but he did not want to talk to them -especially not to Barrundia, who was told that he should not try to come in to talk to Carrera if he wanted to remain alive.  After this, Morazán began a strong offensive, destroying every single town in his path, stealing the few belongings and forcing Carrera militants to hide in the mountains.

Thinking that Carrera was completely defeated, Morazán and Barrundia went on to Guatemala City, where governor Valenzuela and the conservative criollos of the Aycinena family celebrated finally having a leader like Morazán, who had defeated Carrera and his peasant revolt once and for all. The Guatemalans offered to sponsor any campaign that Morazán wanted at that point.  Morazán helped Los Altos and appointed Mariano Rivera Paz, who was close to the Aycinena family; however he did not return to the former aristocrats any of their confiscated possessions. In return, Juan José de Aycinena y Piñol, leader of the family, voted in favor of dissolving the Central American Federation, thus forcing Morazán to return to El Salvador to try to save what was left of his presidential powers. On his way to El Salvador, he increased repression, on anybody suspect of helping Carrera in the past.

Knowing that Morazán was on his way to El Salvador, Carrera tried to take Salamá with the little forces that he still had left, but was defeated and even lost his brother Laureano in the battle.  With only a handful of men he was able to escape, badly wounded, to Sanarate. After a halfway recovery, Carrera had a few more battles where he won, but suffered considerable casualties.

Finally, the liberal forces captured Carrera, but could not shoot him, because the Central American Federation was in turmoil and they needed the caudillo to keep the peasants in check. Morazán was forced to appoint him as commander in Mita.  Morazán would come to regret that decision, as Carrera would eventually defeat him in 1840, finishing the Honduran general run as the main political figure of Central America.

As of 1850, the population was estimated to be 4,500.

Miguel Enríquez and president Barillas in 1892 

In 1892, president general Manuel Barillas called an election.  It was the first time a Guatemalan president had become tired of the office and it was also the first election in Guatemala that allowed the candidates to run propaganda in the local newspapers.  Among the candidates who ran for office were:

 Lorenzo Montúfar y Rivera: a well known a respected liberal intellectual. He was the only one of all candidates who made an engraving of his portrait to publish it in the newspapers and was accused of wasting resources for doing this.
 General José María Reyna Barrios: nephew of former president Justo Rufino Barrios and eventual winner.
 Miguel Enríquez: a Salamá landowner. Enríquez had been a liberal, but became a conservative after the persecution that he suffered from the Barillas administration.

Barillas was unique among all liberal presidents of Guatemala between 1871 and 1944: he handed over power to his successor peacefully. When election time approached, he sent for the three Liberal candidates to ask them what their government plan would be. Satisfied with the response of Reyna Barrios, Barillas made sure a huge column of Quetzaltenango and Totonicapán Indigenous people came down from the mountains to vote for the general. The official agents did their job: Reyna was elected president and, so as not to offend the losing candidates, Barillas gave them checks to cover the costs of their presidential campaigns. Reyna Barrios of course received nothing, but he went on to become President on March 15, 1892.

Only Enríquez was not compensated; on the contrary, after the elections he had to run away from his farmland in Salamá after being accused of sedition; he was captured and executed near Zacapa.

Miguel Ángel Asturias in Salamá 

In 1904, the father of future Literature Nobel Prize awardee Miguel Ángel Asturias, who was a judge, freed several students that had been detained after rioting. In consequence president Manuel Estrada Cabrera, and removed him from his post. In 1905, the family was forced to move to Salamá, where Miguel Ángel Asturias lived on his grandparents' farm and  came in contact with Guatemalan natives for the first time. His nanny, Lola Reyes, was a native girl who told him stories, myths and legends from her culture which eventually would impact heavily in his work. In 1908, when Asturias was nine years old, his family returned to Guatemala City.

Anticommunist rebellion in 1953 

During the revolutionary government of colonel Jacobo Árbenz, the opposition - mainly formed by Guatemalan landlords and United Fruit Company executives - was completely against any reform that the government of Juan José Arévalo had established: social security, creation of commercial and public labor unions, democracy and freedom of press, among others. At the election of Árbenz in 1950, the Guatemalan elite was desperate, but most of its members hoped that the new president would back out of the policies of his predecessor, whom they accused of communism. Árbenz' image convinced them of that: the Guatemalan colonel was married to María Cristina Vilanova, a lady from the Salvadorian elite. He was an Army officer, lived in a mansion in zone 10 in Guatemala City and had the proper aristocratic presence. But their hopes were shattered when Árbenz supported the formation of the Guatemalan Communist Party and then pushed for aggressive agrarian reform. Confronted with the situation, the opposition had only one clear goal: to defend the privileges that they had enjoyed in Guatemala for generations and so they embraced anticommunism to justify their fight against the government. On the other hand, the middle class enjoyed benefits that allowed them to prosper and they were loyal to Árbenz. The peasants were for the first time since the Rafael Carrera government treated with respect and dignity.

This was the political and economic situation of the country when on 29 March 1953 the anticommunist opposition assaulted Salamá at dawn: approximately 100 rebels invaded Salamá and neighboring San Jerónimo. The invasion was not properly organized and by 6:00 am was completedly defeated by army forces that arrived from Cobán. This event however began government prosecution of anticommunist elements, which gradually escalated until it became pure repression in May 1954, when CIA Operation PBSuccess and the Carlos Castillo Armas invasion were well in progress and the Arbenz regime was practically doomed.

Festivals

The annual festival takes place from September 17 to September 22.

Climate

Salamá has a tropical savanna climate (Köppen: Aw).

Geography and location

Settlements 
Salamá has 146 settlements, being the main ones:

 San Nicolás
 El Tunal
 El Tempisque
 San Juan
 Paso Ancho
 Las Tunas
 La Laguna
 San Ignacio
 Trapiche de Agua
 Llano Grande
 Los Paxtes
 La Canoa
 Chilascó
 Niño Perdido
 La Unión Barrios
 La Paz 1 y 2
 Cachil
 El Amate
 San José El Espinero
 Las Limas
 El Nance
 Llano Largo
 La Divina Providencia

San Rafael Chilasco is the largest settlement and is a tourist attraction given that it has one of the tallest waterfalls in Central America.

Geographic location 

Salamá is surrounded by Baja Verapaz municipalities, except by South, where it borders Chuarrancho, a Guatemala Department municipality.

See also 
 
 
 Baja Verapaz
 History of Guatemala
 Order of Preachers
 List of places in Guatemala

Notes and references

References

Bibliography

External links
 
 Salama article - Guatemalan Tourism Committee (in Spanish)

Municipalities of the Baja Verapaz Department